Why Girls Go Back Home is a lost 1926 American silent comedy drama film produced and distributed by Warner Bros. James Flood directed and Patsy Ruth Miller and Clive Brook starred. Myrna Loy has a feature role. The film is a sequel to Warner Bros.'s 1921 Why Girls Leave Home, which was a box office hit.

Plot
Marie Downey (Patsy Ruth Miller), a trusting country girl falls in love with a touring stage-actor, Clifford Dudley (Clive Brook) as his touring troupe takes up residence in the hotel run by Marie's father. Both lovestruck and stagestruck, Marie follows Clifford to old Broadway, where she ends up getting a job as a chorus girl. She tries desperately to get in touch with Clifford, but he acts as if he does not even know she's alive as he becomes a matinée idol on Broadway. Thanks to a lucky break, Marie becomes the star of the show in which she is appearing, whereupon Clifford finally acknowledges her existence. This time, however, she gives Clifford the cold shoulder then turns her back on New York and heads home (hence the title). Clifford follows her on the train, setting the stage for a tender reconciliation.

Cast
Patsy Ruth Miller as Marie Downey
Clive Brook as Clifford Dudley
Jane Winton as Model
Myrna Loy as Sally Short
George O'Hara as John Ross
Joseph J. Dowling as Joe Downey
Virginia Ainsworth as Crook in Badger Game
Brooks Benedict as Crook in Badger Game
Herbert Prior as Crook in Badger Game

Preservation status
This film is now lost. Warner Bros. records of the film's negative have a notation, "Junked 12/27/48" (i.e., December 27, 1948). Warner Bros. destroyed many of its pre-1933 negatives in the late 1940s and 1950s due to nitrate film decomposition. No copies of Why Girls Go Back Home are known to exist.

References

External links

1926 films
American silent feature films
Lost American films
Films directed by James Flood
Warner Bros. films
1926 comedy-drama films
1920s English-language films
American black-and-white films
1926 lost films
Lost comedy-drama films
1920s American films
Silent American comedy-drama films